Dávid Šoltés (born February 5, 1995) is a Slovak professional ice hockey right winger player who currently plays with HC '05 Banská Bystrica of the Slovak Extraliga.

Šoltés played junior hockey in the Western Hockey League for the Prince George Cougars, who drafted him 4th overall in the 2013 CHL Import Draft. He played two seasons for the Cougars between 2013 and 2015 before returning to his native Slovakia with his hometown team HC Košice. On January 25, 2019, Šoltés was traded to HC '05 Banská Bystrica for Ján Sýkora.

Career statistics

Regular season and playoffs

International

References

External links

 

1995 births
Living people
HC '05 Banská Bystrica players
HK Dukla Michalovce players
HC Košice players
Prince George Cougars players
Slovak ice hockey right wingers
Sportspeople from Košice
Slovak expatriate ice hockey players in Canada